Porrino is a surname. Notable people with the surname include:

Angel Porrino (born 1989), American television personality, actress, dancer, and showgirl
Christopher Porrino (born 1967), American trial lawyer

See also
Porrini